Satish Parasmal Jain (18 August 1968) is a former candidate from Aam Aadmi Party (AAP) who was contesting from the North Mumbai (Mumbai North) constituency in the 2014 Lok Sabha Elections, which he lost getting 32,364 votes. Prior to trying himself in politics he worked as a portfolio manager for HDFC Mutual Fund and as an Executive Director for Morgan Stanley. Satish Jain gained media attention after exposing the Rs 22,000 crore (INR 22 billion) electricity scam in Maharashtra.

Early life
Satish Jain is married to Meenal Jain, who studied engineering and is an artist by profession. The couple have two children, Dhwanit and Kartika. Satish practices Raja Yoga meditation.

Education and professional life

Bachelors
Satish Jain completed his bachelor's degree in Engineering from College of Engineering, Pune.

Masters
Satish Jain has a MBA from IIM Bangalore.

Finance Industry
Jain worked in the finance industry for 18 years prior to involvement in politics. He worked with HDFC Mutual Fund as a portfolio manager and with Morgan Stanley as an Executive Director.

Entry into Politics
On 13 March 2014  Satish Jain was nominated as a candidate for Aam Aadmi Party in the North Mumbai constituency. Other candidates of AAP are Mayank Gandhi (North-West Mumbai), Meera Sanyal (South Mumbai), Medha Patkar (North-East Mumbai).

2014 Lok Sabha Elections

References

Maharashtra politicians
Aam Aadmi Party politicians
21st-century Indian politicians
Politicians from Mumbai
Aam Aadmi Party candidates in the 2014 Indian general election
1968 births
Living people